Kherlen River (also known as Kern or Kerülen;) is a 1,254 km river in Mongolia and China.

Course
This area constitutes the divide between the Arctic (Tuul River) and Pacific (Kherlen, Onon) basins and is consequently named “Three River Basins”.

From there the Kherlen flows in a mostly eastern direction through the Khentii aimag.

Kherlen-Ergune-Amur

See also 
 List of rivers of Mongolia

References 

Kherulen river
International rivers of Asia